The 2014 Italian GT Championship was the 23rd season of the Italian GT Championship, the grand tourer-style sports car racing founded by the Italian automobile club (Automobile Club d'Italia). The season started on 11 May at Misano and ended on 26 October at Monza after seven double-header meetings.

The drivers' championship was won by Scuderia Baldini 27 Network drivers Lorenzo Casè and Raffaele Giammaria, finishing just three points of their nearest rivals, Marco Mapelli and Thomas Schoeffler. A further fifteen points behind in third place were MP1 Corse's Nicola Benucci. While GTC category was won by Massimo Omar Galbiatil.

Race calendar and results

Standings

Drivers' championship

GT3

GTC

References

External links
 
 Italian GT on RacingSportCars

Italian GT season
Italian Motorsports Championships